Tell Keisan, تل كيسان (Arabic name meaning "the mound of treachery" ) or Tel Kisson, תל כיסון (Hebrew name), is an archaeological site located  from the Mediterranean coast in the Galilee region of Israel between Haifa and Akko. The tell is approximately 15 acres in size and is composed of the accumulated ruins of many large cities dating back to the Chalcolithic period.

History 
The Galilee region is known for agricultural production, particularly olive oil. Tell Keisan is thought to have been a major granary for Akko. Tell Keisan is located off the ancient road of Via Maris which connected Egypt and Syria. Some scholars hypothesize that at one point in its history it was the city of Achshaph or Biblical Cabul.

Tell Keisan was very large and prosperous in the early and middle Bronze Age. At this time it was fortified with a glacis and stone wall. In the late Bronze Age, the settlement was significantly smaller and a destruction level is distinguishable around the early 12th century BCE. It was rebuilt and reoccupied at the beginning of the Iron Age in the second half of the 11th century and appeared successful and "stratigraphically undisturbed." It is hypothesized that during the Iron Age it was a Tyrian enclave of Phoenicia. In the 8th century it was again destroyed and abandoned. Reinhabited in the 7th c. where there is archaeological evidence of Neo-Assyrian civilization. It was destroyed again by the end of that century. A Neo-Assyrian cuneiform tablet was found at the site. It was reoccupied throughout Persian and Hellenistic periods and again abandoned in the 2nd century BCE.

Strabo refers to the city of Acre as once a rendezvous for the Persians in their expeditions against Egypt. According to historians such as Diodorus Siculus and Strabo, King Cambyses II attacked Egypt after massing a huge army on the plains near the city of Acre. In December 2018 archaeologists digging at the site of Tell Keisan in Acre unearthed the remains of a Persian military outpost that might have played a role in the successful 525 B.C. Achaemenid invasion of Egypt. The Persian-period fortifications at Tell Keisan were later heavily damaged during Alexander the Great's fourth-century B.C. campaign to drive the Achaemenids out of the Levant.

There is archaeological evidence of Roman artifacts and a major road passing on the west side of the tell was paved during the Roman period. A church was built during the Byzantine period and lasted until the 7th century CE. The land of Akko changed hands between the crusaders and Arab army of Saladin a number of times in the 12th and 13th centuries, and Tell Keisan was used by Saladin as a base.

Ottoman, and modern era
The village had 6 Muslim households, who paid a tax-rate of 16,6% on various products, including wheat (1950 akçe); barley (770 akçe); cotton (1200 akçe); occasional revenues (50 akçe); and goats and beehives (125 akçe); a total of 4,095 akçe.

In  1881, the PEF's Survey of Western Palestine (SWP) noted: "Guerin gives the measurement of the mound at 350 paces in length from west to east, by 125 in its greatest breadth; it is about 130 feet high. It is ascended at the north and south by a kind of slope produced by artificial depression of the ground. The plateau on the top is covered with fragments of pottery, and among them cubes of mosaic; heaps of stones from buildings now destroyed are also scattered about. On this Tell Saladin had his head quarters during the siege of St. Jean d'Acre by Guy de Lusignan, Richard Coeur de Lion, and Philip Augustus."

Today the tell is located on a privately owned farm. A portion of the tell is currently a cultivated olive grove.

Excavations

1935-1936 

 Conducted by J. Garstang and A. Rowe.
 Neilson expedition.

1971-1979 

 Led by R. de Vaux, J. Pringnaud, J. Briend, and J.-B. Humbert.
 École Biblique et Archéologique Française in Jerusalem.
 Unearthed a church and a stone carving of a cross dated to the 6th c. CE.
 According to Pritchard (1981), this excavation is of major importance to the archaeological understanding of the Iron age in this region.

2002 

 Directed by Y. Tepper, with the assistance of Y. Ya‘aqoby and Y. Dangor.
 Conducted on behalf of the Israel Antiquities Authority and funded by the Municipality of Tamra.
 Dig conducted north east of the tell.
 Discovered ruins spanning multiple periods which show that the city extended the boundary of the tell at times.

2005 & 2006 

 Four small digs of the wall and areas surrounding the tell, conducted by the Israel Antiquities Authority in tandem with various other institutions.

2016 to present 
 Headed by David Schloen of the University of Chicago and Gunnar Lehmann of Ben-Gurion University
 Hosted by the Oriental Institute of the University of Chicago and Ben-Gurion University of the Negev
Excavation focused on the north eastern corner of the tell.

Archaeological features

Silver Hoard 
Phoenician era Tell Keisan, particularly during the second half of the 11th century BC, is one of the find spots of silver hoards belonging to the Cisjordan corpus of hacksilber. The hoard was found in the courtyard of a domestic complex inside of a Phoenician Bichrome jug in Stratum 9a, Area B, L635. The hoard is the dated the earliest of the hoards in the Cisjordan corpus. The hoard includes cut ingots, sheets, wires, rods, jewelry, four linen wrapped bundles of hacksilber sealed with unbaked clay bullae, and loose fragments. The total weight of the hoard was 345g. Tell Keisan along with Tel Dor are the only locations in the Near East where bundles sealed with bullae have been found. The silver found here contains copper percentages, (19 ± 12.6%), that is much higher than naturally occurring amounts. Eshel et al. infers that this indicates that copper was intentionally added to the silver. This is one of the factors that causes Eshel et al. to refute the idea that the Cisjordan corpus was quality controlled. Two cloth samples with the hoard were radiocarbon dated to 1210–1010 BC (2915 ± 70 C14 years BP) and 1040–920 BC (2830 ± 45 years BP). Oxcal 4.2 was used for calibration.

Transport Amphorae 
"Loop handle jars" are transport amphorae (Pithos) with two large handles that extend well above the lip of the jar. Dozens of loop handle jars were found in Tell Keisan. One variety of these jars, which were biconical shaped, dated to around 700-650 BCE. L. Courtois (1980) determined through petrographic analysis that these pots could not have been made locally in Tell Keisan. Gunneweg and Perlman (1991) traced the clay used to make these pots back to Kalopsida in Eastern Cyprus. They established this through Neutron Activation Analysis (NAA), comparing the composition of pots from Tell Keisan to clays from various potential sources. The clays seen in Tell Keisan appeared in two types, buff pink and grey green. These two are in fact of the same chemical composition and vary in color due to oxygenation conditions during firing. This variation was stated to be typical of the clay source in Kalopsida. In their analysis they also refute previous claims that this variety of loop handle jars originated from Rhodes, based again on chemical composition. A similar NAA analysis of a Mycenae stirrup jar discovered on level 13 (c. 1200 BC) found it to be from Kouklia. It is also thought that the large quantities of bevel rimmed bowls, in comparison to other nearby locations, suggest a strong tie to Cyprus.

See also
Cities of the ancient Near East

References

Bibliography

 
 p. 663

External links
Site for current U Chicago Archaeological dig
Survey of Western Palestine, Map 5:    IAA, Wikimedia commons

Archaeological sites in Israel
Galilee
Tells (archaeology)
Cambyses II
Bronze Age sites in Israel
Phoenician colonies in Asia